Roman Nikolayevich Filipov (born August 13, 1984 – died February 3, 2018) was a Russian military pilot who killed himself in a last stand to avoid being captured after being wounded by militants when his Su-25SM jet was shot down in Idlib Province, Syria, on February 3, 2018. Filipov was posthumously awarded the honor of the Hero of the Russian Federation.

Biography 

Roman Filipov was born in Voronezh into the family of a military pilot and graduated from school No. 85 in Voronezh in 2001.

Upon completing the Krasnodar Higher Military Aviation School, he was posted at the air base in the village of Chernigovka, Primorsky Krai, ( north of Vladivostok) in the Russian Far East. In the summer of 2017, he was stationed in Sakhalin.

Uploaded videos showed the jet was part of a two-ship formation flying at low-to-medium altitude, with the downed aircraft separating and diving to perform a rocket attack. While pulling up after deploying air to ground rockets without deploying defensive flares, the Su-25 was hit by a missile. He was downed by militants over the province of Idlib, near the town of Maarrat al-Nu'man ( north of the city of Hama), or the town of Saraqib, according to other sources, presumably by a shoulder launched surface to air missile. Responsibility was claimed by Tahrir al-Sham (formerly known as Jabhat Al-Nusra) and Jaysh al-Nasr, which is affiliated with the Free Syrian Army.

Filipov survived the crash and was last seen on live footage being surrounded by militants and committing suicide with a grenade to avoid capture. On the same day, Russian forces retaliated by firing Kalibr missiles targeting rebel positions in Idlib province responsible for the downing, killing at least 30 rebel fighters.

Filipov's body was repatriated to Russia on February 6, 2018, where he was posthumously awarded the title of Hero of the Russian Federation via presidential decree.
  Filipov was buried on February 8, 2018, at the Alley of Glory of the Kominternovskoye Cemetery in Voronezh, Russia with thousands of people in attendance. In a speech to the Russian Parliament, Russian President Vladimir Putin hailed his courage and service.

See also
 List of last stands
 Russian Armed Forces casualties in Syria
 Russian military intervention in the Syrian Civil War
 List of aviation shootdowns and accidents during the Syrian Civil War

Notes

External links 

 Fighter pilot killed in Syria jet downing posthumously nominated for Hero of Russia title TASS, 5 February 2017

1984 births
2018 deaths
Heroes of the Russian Federation
People from Voronezh
Suicides by explosive device
Russian military personnel killed in the Syrian civil war
21st-century Russian military personnel
Deaths by hand grenade
Shot-down aviators
Russian aviators
Suicides in Syria